Alexis & Fido, a.k.a. Los Pitbulls, Los Reyes Del Perreo, are a reggaeton duo from Puerto Rico. They are CEOs and co-founders of Wild Dogz Music. In 2008, Sobrenatural was nominated for Album Urbano. In 2012, "Energía" was nominated for Canción Urbana. In 2013, "Rompe la Cintura" was nominated for – Interpretación Urbana. Nominated for the 2014 awards, "Álbum Urbano" with La Esencia.

Musical career 
According to Fido, he and Yandel were close friends as teenagers and helped each other kick-start their careers. Likewise, Alexis was close to Wisin, and also helped him with his career. Eventually the two duos were formed, Alexis & Fido and Wisin & Yandel, and went their separate ways. Alexis & Fido featured on Yandel's solo album Quien Contra Mí, in Wisin's solo album El Sobreviviente and Wisin & Yandel featured on Alexis & Fido's Los Reyes Del Perreo album. These plans include working with artists like Arcángel, Wisin & Yandel again, and many more artists.

Their debut album, 2005's The Pitbulls, debuted at the No. 2 spot on Billboards Top Heatseekers and the Latin Rhythm charts and at the No. 1 spot on the Top Latin Albums chart, eventually reaching gold status with over 200,000 copies sold worldwide. Their debut single, 2005's "Eso Ehh!", entered the Top 10 of Billboards Hot Latin Singles chart and was featured on an episode of HBO's The Wire, and on the television series Entourage.

In 2006, Alexis y Fido released the singles collection Los Reyes Del Perreo. Before the release of their second album Sobrenatural (2007), Alexis y Fido appeared in the reggaetón-centered drama, Feel the Noise, produced by Jennifer Lopez and starring R&B singer Omarion,  Melonie Diaz and Rosa Arredondo. The album spawned two singles, "5 Letras" and "Soy Igual Que Tú", both of which topped the Latin Rhythm chart. The latter remained atop Billboard Latin Rhythm chart for over a month. Sobrenatural sold over 100,000 units worldwide.

The duo was invited to perform alongside Camila at the 2008 Billboard Latin Music Awards and they joined Toby Love on stage at the 2008 Premios Juventud awards show. They were nominated for two Latin Grammy Awards for "Soy Igual Que Tú" and in the Best Urban Music Album field for Sobrenatural. 

In 2009 they released Down to Earth. In November 2010, they released the album Perreología. Its first single "Rescate" features Daddy Yankee while the second single "Zombie" features Yaviah.

Recently, they've done collaborations with artists such as Bad Bunny with the song "Tocate Tú Misma" and Noriel with the song "Desobediente".

Personal information 
Alexis' real name is Raúl Alexis Ortiz (born August 5, 1982), while Fido's real name is Joel Fido Martínez (born August 13, 1981). They own the label Wild Dogz, which they created in 2006. According to Alexis & Fido, in an interview, the song "El Palo" put them on the map and made them known. In 2008, the duo participated in a campaign to promote voting in the 2008 general elections in Puerto Rico. This initiative included a concert titled "Vota o quédate callao" (in English, vote or be quiet).

Discography 

 2005: The Pitbulls
 2006: Los Reyes Del Perreo
 2007: Sobrenatural
 2009: Down to Earth
 2011: Perreología
 2012: Piden Perreo... Lo Más Duro
 2014: La Esencia
 2020: La Escuela
 2021: Barrio Canino, Pt. 1

References

External links 
 Alexis y Fido Los reyes del 'perreo' El Diario La Prensa, November 14, 2006

Puerto Rican rappers
Puerto Rican musical duos
People from Cayey, Puerto Rico
21st-century Puerto Rican male singers
Reggaeton duos
Musical groups established in 2002
2002 establishments in Puerto Rico
Sony BMG Norte artists
Sony Music Latin artists
Warner Music Latina artists
Universal Music Latino artists